Henry Miller House is a historic home located near Mossy Creek, Augusta County, Virginia. The original section was built about 1785, and expanded in the mid-19th century. It is a two-story, stone and brick dwelling with a combined gable and hipped roof.  It consists of a square, four-bay, double-pile section with a three-bay, single-pile attached wing to form unbroken seven-bay facade. It features a full-width, one-story porch. Also on the property are a contributing two-story, one-cell rubble stone kitchen and two-story, three-bay, single-cell spring house.

It was listed on the National Register of Historic Places in 1978.

References

Houses on the National Register of Historic Places in Virginia
Houses completed in 1785
Houses in Augusta County, Virginia
National Register of Historic Places in Augusta County, Virginia